Tejedor is a Spanish occupational surname meaning "weaver". It may refer to:

 Ángela Molina Tejedor (b. 1955), Spanish actress
 Carlos Tejedor (politician) (1817–1903), Argentine jurist and politician
 Francisco Tejedor (b. 1966), Colombian boxer
Ernesto Valverde Tejedor, Spanish manager
 Luis Herrero-Tejedor Algar (b. 1955), Spanish politician
 Marta Tejedor (b. 1968), Spanish football coach
 Mónica Molina Tejedor (b. 1968), Spanish actress
 Ramón Tejedor (b. 1955), Spanish politician
 Romnick Sarmenta Tejedor (b. 1972), Filipino actor

See also
 Carlos Tejedor (disambiguation)
 Tejedor (band)
 Tejedor top shell

Spanish-language surnames